The Parliamentary Under-Secretary of State for Safeguarding (also known as Minister for Safeguarding) is a junior role in the British Home Office. It is held by Sarah Dines MP from October 2022.

Responsibilities 
The minister has the following responsibilities:

 tackling violence against women and girls including 
 domestic abuse
 FGM and forced marriage
 child sexual abuse and exploitation
 Disclosure and Barring Service
 Gangmasters and Labour Abuse Authority
 sexual violence
 rape review
 prostitution
 stalking
 hate crime
 crime prevention
 early youth intervention
 victim support
 victims elements of RASSO

List of ministers 

 Sarah Newton as Parliamentary Under Secretary of State for Crime, Safeguarding and Vulnerability
Victoria Atkins as Parliamentary Under-Secretary of State for Safeguarding
Rachel Maclean
Amanda Solloway
Mims Davies
Sarah Dines

References 

Home Office (United Kingdom)
Lists of government ministers of the United Kingdom
Caregiving